Colberg is a surname, and may refer to:

 Frederick Colberg (born ), an American welterweight and Olympic boxer
 Lawrence Kohlberg (1927–1987), American psychologist, conceiver of a theory on stages of moral development
 Rebekah Colberg (1918–1994), Puerto Rican athlete
 Talis Colberg, former Attorney General of Alaska

See also
Bad Colberg-Heldburg, town in Thuringia, Germany
Battle of Colberger Heide between Sweden and Denmark in 1644
Kołobrzeg in Poland (Kolberg)
Golberg (disambiguation)
Goldberg (disambiguation)

Surnames